Zahir al-Din may refer to:

Zahir ad-Din Toghtekin (died 1128), Turkic military leader who was atabeg of Damascus
Zahir-al-Din Faryabi (died 1201), Persian poet
Zahir al-Din Karawi (fl. 1355/56), leader of the Sarbadars of Sabzewar
Zahir ud-din Muhammad Babur (1483–1531), Muslim conqueror who laid the basis for the Mughal dynasty of India
Chowdhury Abd-Allah Zaheeruddin, known as Lal Mia (1903–1969), Bengali politician
Humayun Zahiruddin Amir-i Kabir, or Humayun Kabir (1906–1969), Indian politician
A. M. Zahiruddin Khan (1936–2005), Bangladeshi industrialist and politician
Zahir Uddin Ahmed (born 1957), Chief of Staff of Bangladesh Navy
Zaheer-ud-din Babar Awan (born 1957?/1959?), Pakistani politician

Arabic masculine given names